Marcgraviastrum is a flowering plant genus in the family Marcgraviaceae.

Species include:
 Marcgraviastrum gigantophyllum
 Marcgraviastrum sodiroi

References

 
Ericales genera
Taxonomy articles created by Polbot